The Cabo Verde Basketball League (CVBL) is a professional men's basketball league Cape Verde. The league was founded in 2021 as the Praia Basketball League by former professional player António de Pina, as a way to boost tourism on the island and to boost the economy. In its first season, the league only featured teams from the country's capital Praia. The CVBL is recognised by the Cape Verdean Basketball Federation (Federação Cabo-Verdiana de Basquetebol), but is organised by Overseas Basketball Connection.

It is the first-ever professional league in Cape Verde.

History 
The league was founded as the Praia Basketball League in 2021 as the first professional basketball league in Cape Verde. It was founded by US-based Cape Verdean António de Pina, who was a former professional player. Only teams from the capital of Praia played in the inaugural season. On July 24, 2021, the Plateau Warriors won the inaugural title.

After the first season, the league changed its name to Cabo Verde Basketball League and new teams from Sal and São Vicente entered the league. The 2022 season began on June 12 and ended July 31, 2022.

Format 
Each season, the CVBL holds a draft, for which players can register. Each season exists out of six teams, that play a regular season to determine their seeds for the playoffs.

Teams 
The following six teams played in the 2021 and 2022 season:

2021 teams

2022 teams

Champions

References

External links 

 Official website

Basketball in Cape Verde